The Beehive is a mountain located in Banff National Park of Alberta, Canada. It was named by  J. Willoughby Astley in 1890 because the mountain resembles a beehive. The mountain is also known as the Big Beehive as there is a smaller beehive shaped mountain nearby called the Little Beehive.

The mountain is located above Lake Louise and can be accessed via hiking trails either from Lake Louise or Lake Agnes.

See also
 Mountains of Alberta

References

Two-thousanders of Alberta
Alberta's Rockies